Ministry of Lands and Natural Resources may refer to:

 Ministry of Lands and Natural Resources (Ghana)
 Ministry of Lands and Natural Resources (Tonga)
 Ministry of Lands and Natural Resources (Zambia)